Bheemili Kabadi Jattu is a 2010 Telugu-language sports drama film written by newcomer Tatineni Satya, starring Nani, and Saranya Mohan along with numerous newcomers. It is a remake of the 2009 Tamil film Vennila Kabadi Kuzhu.

This film marks the directorial debut of Tatineni Satya. The film completed 100 days in Srikakulam town Kinnera complex and Chandramahal theatres and was a great hit.

Story
The story unfolds in a remote village near Vizag called Bheemli. What begins as a soft romance between a poor lad Suri (Nani) and a girl (Saranya Mohan) who comes to the village soon takes a turn. Suri, with his childhood friends, yearns to win a Kabaddi tournament. They're known for never managing to win a tournament.

They find themselves by chance in a state-level tournament, expected to be knocked out in the first round. But the bunch of young men who share different thoughts and ideas, with the help of a professional kabaddi coach, emerge as winners. As they proceed, many difficulties are encountered such as Suri having a shoulder dislocation during a match. They win their remaining games and progress to the final. However, during this time, gangsters are searching for Suri.

The final starts off poorly but, after half time, Bheemli Kabaddi Jattu is back in contention. As the game ends in a tie, a player from each team goes up against each other. In the final stages of the head-to-head, Suri wins the game but dies after winning the last point as the opposition player kicks him on the chest as to touch him and win the game. Suri uses his last breath to win the match.

The scene changes to several months later when the girl returns to the place they met  searching for Suri. Suri's friend plans to tell her but discards it as he feels that she won't be able to withstand the sad news. Suri's mother is seen crying in her house with Suri's photograph beside her.

Cast

 Nani as Suri
 Saranya Mohan 
 Kishore as Prakash
 Dhanraj as Paidithalli 
 Vinay as Suri's friend 
 Santosh as Suri's friend
 Siva as Suri's friend 
 Ramesh as Devudu
 Krishna Chaitanya as Suri's friend 
 Chalaki Chanti as Pentiga 
 Vithika Sheru
 Siddu Jonnalagadda as Dhinesh
 Krishneswara Rao

Soundtrack
The Music Was Composed By V. Selvaganesh and released by Aditya Music. All lyrics were penned by Vanamali.

Reception
A critic from Sify wrote that "Bhimili Kabaddi Jattu, on the whole, surely keeps you glued to your seat because the match scenes look real.  a sports film in the true spirit and it is convincingly told. Good attempt, and nice film". A critic from Rediff.com opined that "Bheemili Kabaddi Jattu scores high marks as it's a realistic and touching tale. It's not often one gets to see such films!"

References

External links
Bheemli Kabadi Jattu Movie Review, SuperGoodMovies.com
Bheemli Kabadi Jattu Movie Review, FullHyderabad.com

2010 films
Indian sports drama films
Telugu remakes of Tamil films
Sports films based on actual events
2010s Telugu-language films
2010 directorial debut films
2010s sports drama films
Films set in Andhra Pradesh
Films shot in Andhra Pradesh
Films set in Visakhapatnam
Kabaddi in India
Super Good Films films